Sir Stephen John Lindsay Oliver, KC (born 14 November 1938) is a retired British judge.

Background
 Called to the Bar (Middle Temple), 1963
 Appointed King's Counsel, 1980
 Appointed Recorder, 1989
 Circuit Judge, 1991
 Presiding Special Commissioner and President of the VAT and Duties Tribunals, 1992
 Knighted, 2007
 Acting President, Tax Chamber of the First-tier Tribunal (1 April 2009 – 6 April 2011)
 Retired, 6 April 2011

References
 OLIVER, Sir Stephen (John Lindsay), Who's Who 2012, A & C Black, 2012; online edn, Oxford University Press, Dec 2011, accessed 15 Feb 2012

20th-century English judges
21st-century English judges
Knights Bachelor
Living people
1938 births
20th-century King's Counsel
21st-century King's Counsel